The 2023 Nonthaburi Challenger was a professional tennis tournament played on hard courts. It was the 4th edition of the tournament which was part of the 2023 ATP Challenger Tour. It took place in Nonthaburi, Thailand from 2 to 7 January 2023.

Singles main-draw entrants

Seeds

 1 Rankings are as of 26 December 2022.

Other entrants
The following players received wildcards into the singles main draw:
  Maximus Jones
  Palaphoom Kovapitukted
  Thantub Suksumrarn

The following players received entry from the qualifying draw:
  Alafia Ayeni
  Evgeny Donskoy
  Giovanni Fonio
  Dayne Kelly
  Lucas Pouille
  Henri Squire

Champions

Singles

 Dennis Novak def.  Wu Tung-lin 6–4, 6–4.

Doubles

 Marek Gengel /  Adam Pavlásek def.  Robert Galloway /  Hans Hach Verdugo 7–6(7–4), 6–4.

References

2023 in Thai sport
2023 ATP Challenger Tour
January 2023 sports events in Thailand